T. Palur was former constituency in the Tamil Nadu Legislative Assembly of Tamil Nadu a southern state of India. It was in Ariyalur district.

Madras state

Election results

1962

1957

References

External links
 

Ariyalur district
Former assembly constituencies of Tamil Nadu